Érika Alejandra Olivera de la Fuente (born 4 January 1976 in Quinta Normal) is a female marathon runner from Chile and deputy for the National Renewal party.
She has competed at five Olympic Games, the most Olympic appearances ever by a female marathon runner.

Career

She took the gold medal at the 1999 Pan American Games, setting a Pan American Games record at 2:37.41 hours. She won a bronze at the following edition in 2003. Starting in 1996, she represented her native country in three consecutive Summer Olympics, and also the 2012 Summer Olympics.

Olivera made her breakthrough at the junior level in 1994 when she won the 10,000 metres gold and 3000 metres bronze medals at the South American Junior Championships in Athletics. The following year she upgraded to a gold and a silver medal at the Pan American Junior Championships, before going on to complete a hat-trick of medals at the South American Junior Championships – she secured a 10,000 m and 3000 m double and also won the 1500 metres silver behind Bertha Sánchez.

Olivera is a two-time winner of the South American Cross Country Championships, having beaten all comers in both the long and short races in 1999. She is a five-time winner and course record holder of the Santiago Marathon. She won the 1995 edition of the Buenos Aires Marathon in Argentina and placed fourth at the 74th Saint Silvester Marathon in 1998.

She enjoyed success on the track at continental level, completing a 10,000 metres/5000 metres silver medal double at both the 1997 and 2003 South American Championships in Athletics. Further to this, she won a silver and a bronze at the 1999 edition of the competition. At the Ibero-American Championships, she has won medals in a number of events, beginning with a 5000 m gold medal and 10,000 m bronze in 1996, the 10,000 m gold at the 2000 edition, and finally a silver medal in the 3000 metres steeplechase in 2002.

Her personal best for the marathon is 2:32:23, set at the 1999 Rotterdam Marathon, which is also the Chilean record for the event. She is also the national record holder over the half marathon, 10,000 m and 5000 m.

After completing the marathon at the 2016 Summer Olympics, Olivera became the first female athlete ever in completing five olympic marathons. Immediately after the race, she announced her retirement from competitive athletics. In November 2016, Olivera announced that her last race as a professional will be at the 2017 Santiago Marathon, on which she completed the half-marathon in 1:38:17.

Personal life 
Erika Olivera was married with Ricardo Opazo, who was also her coach. Currently her partner is Chilean marathoner Leslie Encina. She has five children.

The athlete has always been critical with regard to sports financing in Chile, indicating the lack of financial support that she has had to overcome during her athletic career.

In 2015 Olivera manifested her intention of starting a political career once she finishes her athletic profession, considering that she will attempt to become a member of the Chilean Congress Cámara de Diputados de Chile, and showing interest in the Renovación Nacional (RN) party.

In 2016 Olivera revealed that her stepfather had sexually abused her during twelve years of her childhood.

In the 2017 Chilean general election, Oliveira was elected as a deputy for the RN with 30,784 votes, representing Chile's 9th legislative district which includes Quinta Normal, Cerro Navia, Renca, Lo Prado, Recoleta, Independencia, Huechuraba, and Conchalí. She gained controversy after she compared the campaign of former presidential candidate Alejandro Guillier to the government of Venezuelan president Nicolás Maduro.

Olympic results  

Note: Olivera missed the 2008 Summer Olympics due to pregnancy.

Personal bests
1500 m: 4:25.61 –  Talca, 11 April 1997
3000 m: 9:21.73 –  Santiago, 1 May 1999
5000 m: 15:51.45 –  Río de Janeiro, 20 May 2000
10,000 m: 33:23.12 –  Concepción, 30 November 1996
Half marathon: 1:11:54 –  Santiago, 10 September 2000
Marathon: 2:32:23 –  Rotterdam, 18 April 1999
3000 m steeplechase: 10:48.75–  Guatemala, 11 May 2002

International competitions

References

External links
 
 
 Profile 
 Tilastopaja biography

1976 births
Living people
Chilean female long-distance runners
Chilean female marathon runners
Chilean female steeplechase runners
Athletes (track and field) at the 1995 Pan American Games
Athletes (track and field) at the 1996 Summer Olympics
Athletes (track and field) at the 1999 Pan American Games
Athletes (track and field) at the 2000 Summer Olympics
Athletes (track and field) at the 2003 Pan American Games
Athletes (track and field) at the 2004 Summer Olympics
Athletes (track and field) at the 2011 Pan American Games
Athletes (track and field) at the 2012 Summer Olympics
Athletes (track and field) at the 2015 Pan American Games
Athletes (track and field) at the 2016 Summer Olympics
Olympic athletes of Chile
Pan American Games gold medalists for Chile
Pan American Games bronze medalists for Chile
Pan American Games medalists in athletics (track and field)
National Renewal (Chile) politicians
South American Games gold medalists for Chile
South American Games medalists in athletics
Members of the Chamber of Deputies of Chile
Competitors at the 1994 South American Games
Competitors at the 1998 South American Games
Medalists at the 1999 Pan American Games
Medalists at the 2003 Pan American Games
Women members of the Chamber of Deputies of Chile